Lampranthus multiradiatus, the creeping redflush, is a species of shrub in the family Aizoaceae (stone plants). They are succulent plants. They have a self-supporting growth form and simple, broad leaves.

Sources

References 

multiradiatus
Taxa named by N. E. Brown
Taxa named by Nikolaus Joseph von Jacquin